Henri Poupart-Lafarge (born 10 April 1969, in Nancy) is a French business executive and the current CEO of Alstom, a post which he has occupied since February 2016.

After acquiring degrees from École Polytechnique, École des ponts ParisTech, and MIT, he went to work for the World Bank. In 1994, he joined the French Ministry for the Economy and Finance. By 1998, he became Alstom's Head of Investor Relations. Then, he became the Vice President of Distribution Finance. 

Before occupying the position of Alstom's CEO, Henri Poupart-Lafarge was successively Chief Financial Officer of Alstom and President of two sectors of the Alstom Group, Alstom Grid for one year, then, Alstom Transport for five years.

References

1969 births
Living people
French chief executives
École Polytechnique alumni
École des Ponts ParisTech alumni
Corps des ponts
Businesspeople from Nancy, France
Alstom
French energy industry businesspeople